Comic Book Men is a reality television series on AMC that is set inside Kevin Smith's comic book shop, Jay and Silent Bob's Secret Stash, in Red Bank, New Jersey.

Series overview

Episodes

Season 1 (2012) 
{{Episode table |background=#11AE11 |overall= |season= |title= |airdate= |country=US |viewers= |episodes=

{{Episode list
| EpisodeNumber = 5
| EpisodeNumber2 = 5
| Title = Con Gone Wrong
| OriginalAirDate = 
| Viewers = 1.744
| ShortSummary = Items appraised include an Avengers''' 30th anniversary lithograph signed by George Pérez; a photocopy of the Punisher character's original concept sketch; a Barbie doll dressed as Halle Berry in the 2004 Catwoman movie; a "Ninja Claw" action figure connected to, but not featured in the 1985 Commando movie; a poster print said to portray a "gay Superman", and a replica Batman cowl created from the original costume designs for the 1966 TV series. Also, the cast head to a small fan convention at an Elks Lodge where, after a setback, they strike gold among trash.
| LineColor = 11AE11
}}

}}

 Season 2 (2012–13) 

 Season 3 (2013–14) 

 Season 4 (2014–15) 

 Season 5 (2015–16) 

 Season 6 (2016–17) 

 Season 7 (2017–18) 

 The Secret Stash podcast 

Each episode of Comic Book Men is accompanied by a companion podcast, titled The Secret Stash'', which is hosted on the SModcast network. Some podcast episodes were pre-recorded during the filming of show, while others were recorded live on the SModcast Internet Radio station (S.I.R.) directly following the first airing of an episode, allowing the audience to participate by calling in to the show.

References

External links 
 
 
 The Secret Stash podcast official site at SModcast.com

Comic Book Men